Liu Yibing (Chinese:刘轶冰) (born April 16, 1975) is a retired Chinese football player. He used to play for Guangzhou Songri, Guangzhou Pharmaceutical and Shanghai Stars.

References

1975 births
Living people
Chinese footballers
Footballers from Dalian
Guangzhou F.C. players
Pudong Zobon players
China League One players
Association football defenders